Myuna Farm is a public community farm situated in Doveton, Victoria, Australia, alongside the Dandenong Creek.

Activities 
The farm includes a train to the outer sections of the farm, where visitors can view Melbourne's largest Grey-headed flying fox colony containing up to 18,000 bats.

It is a venue oriented toward children and hosts an annual Christmas carol event. The farm offers an environment of River Gums, wetlands and natural bird life within the confines of a suburban landscape.

The farm includes an Animal Display Center offering a hands-on experience with baby animals; bird aviaries housing a collection of Australian Birds; and paddocks providing a range of animals, including native ones such as emus and the kangaroo.

Myuna Farm hosts the local Doveton Show annually. This is a volunteer-run community event coinciding with the Melbourne Show.

References

External links 
Official Myuna Farm Site

Farms in Australia
Tourist attractions in Melbourne
Buildings and structures in the City of Casey